Joseph Henry Dixon  (19 March 1911 – 3 August 2002) was an Australian politician.

He was born in York in England. In 1955 he was elected to the Tasmanian Legislative Council as the independent member for Derwent. He was defeated in 1961 but returned to the Council in 1967, serving as Chair of Committees from 1972 until his second defeat in 1979. He died in Hobart.

References

1911 births
2002 deaths
Independent members of the Parliament of Tasmania
Members of the Tasmanian Legislative Council
Officers of the Order of Australia
20th-century Australian politicians
British emigrants to Australia